Roman Kemp (born 28 January 1993) is a British radio host and television personality. Since 2014, he has presented the national radio network Capital FM and their own breakfast show since 2017. In 2019, Kemp finished in third place in the nineteenth series of I'm A Celebrity...Get Me Out of Here!.

Early life
Kemp is the son of actor and musician Martin Kemp and singer Shirlie Holliman. He has an older sister, Harley Moon (b. 1989). The late singer George Michael was his godfather. 

Kemp was educated at Berkhamsted School until he was 15 and was in the same year as KSI.

Career

2010s
In November 2014, Kemp joined Capital FM to present Sunday 6–9am. He was promoted to Saturday 5–8pm and Sunday 9pm–12am a year later, where he had the chance to interview artists on his show. In February 2016, Kemp became the new face of The Capital Evening Show, weeknights 7–10pm in addition to his Sunday show. In 2017, Kemp began hosting Capital Breakfast from 6am–10am with Vick Hope across London and Saturday 6am–9am across the Network. As a result, he left the evening show. In 2018, Sonny Jay joined Capital Breakfast full-time as a co-presenter. In 2016, Kemp was The X Factor UK'''s digital presenter and social media correspondent. He also co-hosted Nick Kicks on Nicktoons. Since January 2017, he has co-presented 2Awesome on ITV2 with Vick Hope. He also presented The Hot Desk on ITV2. From 2 May 2017, Kemp took over Capital FM London's breakfast show with Hope. He narrated Bromans on ITV2 in 2017, in which his father played Emperor. He appeared in an episode of Len Goodman's Partners in Rhyme. He took part in a celebrity edition of First Dates for Stand Up to Cancer in November 2017.

In November 2017, Kemp was the backstage reporter on Children in Need Rocks the 80s. On 1 March 2018, Kemp hosted the Global Awards alongside Rochelle Humes and Myleene Klass, and returned to present the 2019 Global Awards. On 8 April 2019, Kemp, Hope and Jay became the hosts of the new Capital National Breakfast. In May 2019, it was announced that he would play in the 2019 edition of Soccer Aid, representing the Rest of the World due to his birth in Los Angeles allowing him to be classed as American. Since June 2019, Kemp has appeared in the Channel 4 reality series Celebrity Gogglebox alongside his father. In 2019, Kemp was a contestant on the nineteenth series of the ITV reality series I'm a Celebrity...Get Me Out of Here! and finished in third place. Kemp has also presented London's New Year celebration show twice in 2017 and 2019 alongside performers Nile Rodgers, Chic and Craig David respectively.

2020s
In 2020, Kemp co-hosted a Sunday morning programme with his father, titled Martin & Roman's Sunday Best! on ITV from 14 June 2020. On 19 November 2020, Kemp featured as a guest panellist on the ITV Daytime show Loose Women and was part of the first all male panel in the show's 21-year history. In March 2021, Kemp presented a documentary on BBC Three, Roman Kemp: Our Silent Emergency, exploring the mental health and suicide crisis affecting young men. His friend, producer Joe Lyons, killed himself in August 2020.

From April 2021, Kemp and his father Martin Kemp are presenting  Martin & Roman's Weekend Best!; a spin-off of Martin & Roman's Sunday Best!.

Personal life
In the documentary Roman Kemp: Our Silent Emergency'', Kemp revealed that he came close to attempting suicide after battling with depression for 13 years. Kemp is a supporter of Arsenal F.C.

Filmography

Television

Radio

Web

Awards and nominations

References

External links

1993 births
Living people
BBC television presenters
English radio DJs
English television presenters
I'm a Celebrity...Get Me Out of Here! (British TV series) participants
People educated at Berkhamsted School
People with mood disorders